Ottavio Dazzan (2 January 1958) is an Argentine-born Italian former cyclist. He competed in the sprint event at the 1980 Summer Olympics.

References

External links
 

1958 births
Living people
Italian male cyclists
Olympic cyclists of Italy
Cyclists at the 1980 Summer Olympics
Cyclists from Buenos Aires
People of Friulian descent
Argentine emigrants to Italy
Argentine people of Italian descent
Sportspeople of Italian descent
Pan American Games medalists in cycling
Argentine male cyclists
Pan American Games silver medalists for Argentina
Medalists at the 1975 Pan American Games